Airedale Academy High School (formerly known as Airedale High School) is a secondary school and sixth form on Crewe Road in a suburb of Castleford in West Yorkshire, England. There is a trust called National academy trust which withholds Airedale Junior School , Oyster Park , Airedare Infant School and Airedale Academy.

Admissions
It teaches children from 11–16. It was recently given the status of Arts College for its performing arts.

History
In February 1995, the school suffered its first arson attack, in which a large teaching block was lost.

In June 2003, arsonists burnt down part of the lower school, causing £1 million of damage. The refurbishment after the fire was officially opened in September 2005.

Arsonists set the school alight again on 17 January 2006. Around 100 firefighters attended the blaze. It destroyed three drama studios and the upper school's main hall. A new state of the art Drama department and theatre (Castleford Phoenix Theatre) was officially opened in October 2008.

In the academic year 2011-12, Airedale Academy took its first cohort of sixth form students in at AS Level.
In late 2011, Principal, Paul Frazer, left and, Michaela Blackledge took his place.

In early 2016, Principal, Micheala Blackledge, left and, Elizabeth Fairhurst took her place.

In 2019, Elizabeth Fairhurst took up the role of CEO of the Trust and Lyndsey Proctor took her place as Principal.

Academic performance
In 2008 the school received a rating of Grade 2 (Good) from Ofsted.

Castleford Phoenix Theatre
The Castleford Phoenix Theatre (at Airedale Academy), is West Yorkshire's latest Performing Art's, conference and education centre.

Academy status
The school has been granted academy status and converted on 1 April 2011.

Sixth Form
In the academic year 2011-12, Airedale Academy opened a satellite sixth form of Ossett Academy. The five main study areas are, Business Studies, English Literature, Performing Arts, ICT, and Health & Social Care.

References

External links
 School webpage
 Castleford Phoenix theatre

News items
 Arrests over arson in January 2006
 Fire in January 2006
 2006 fire

Academies in the City of Wakefield
Castleford
Secondary schools in the City of Wakefield
School buildings in the United Kingdom destroyed by arson